The 1824 United States presidential election in Massachusetts took place between October 26 and December 2, 1824, as part of the 1824 United States presidential election. Voters chose 15 representatives, or electors to the Electoral College, who voted for President and Vice President.

During this election, the Democratic-Republican Party was the only major national party, and 4 different candidates from this party sought the Presidency. Massachusetts voted for native son John Quincy Adams.

Results

See also
 United States presidential elections in Massachusetts

References

Massachusetts
1824
1824 Massachusetts elections